Nathan Harris Corddry (born September 8, 1977) is an American actor and comedian best known for his roles as Adam Branch on Harry's Law and for his role as Gabriel in the first two seasons of Mom. He has also guest starred on series such as Law & Order: Criminal Intent, Studio 60 on the Sunset Strip, The Daily Show, United States of Tara, 30 Rock, and New Girl. He also played Private First-Class Loudmouth in the HBO miniseries The Pacific. In 2019, Corddry has played engineer Larry Wilson in the Apple TV+ original science fiction space drama series For All Mankind. In 2021, Corddry has a recurring role in the TV adaptation of Paper Girls playing Larry Radakowski.

Life and career

Corddry was born in Weymouth, Massachusetts, to Robin (née Sullivan) and Steven Corddry, who was a Massachusetts Port Authority official. After graduating from Weymouth High School in 1995, he went to Colby-Sawyer College, where he majored in Communications.

On October 4, 2005, Nate joined The Daily Show as a correspondent. Nate and Rob appeared together in various pieces on the show, including a segment called "Brother vs. Brother" on February 21, 2006. In this segment they formally debated each other on the issue of Big Brother, but their debate quickly turned into immature name-calling, cheap shots by Rob, and an inevitable breaking up of the fight by Jon Stewart.

Corddry also appeared on Guiding Light. In 2005, he appeared in a television commercial for Radio Shack.  He has also done commercial work for Coors Brewing Company, Verizon Communications, Xbox, Dunkin' Donuts, and NYCremembers.org.

Corddry trained at the Williamstown Theater Festival, and recently spent almost a year traveling on the road as an actor in the Broadway touring production of The Graduate. 

In 2006, Corddry was cast in the Aaron Sorkin comedy-drama series Studio 60 on the Sunset Strip alongside Matthew Perry and Amanda Peet, which began airing in September 2006 and was canceled in May 2007. The show was a weekly drama set behind the scenes of a fictitious Saturday Night Live-esque television program called Studio 60 on the Sunset Strip. Corddry played a character named Tom Jeter who was a writer and performer for the show-within-a-show.

Corddry played the recurring role of Gene Stuart on the Showtime series The United States of Tara. He played the Chief of Staff in the live-action film version of Yogi Bear, released 17 December 2010. He co-starred in the legal comedy-drama series Harry's Law which was cancelled after its second season. Corddry voice-acted "Zed" in the Disney XD series Tron: Uprising.

In February 2014, Nate Corddry and his brother were featured alongside Breaking Bad actor Matt L. Jones in the CollegeHumor-produced video for the Guided by Voices single, "Planet Score".

In 2020, Corddry appeared as a guest on the Studio 60 on the Sunset Strip marathon fundraiser episode of The George Lucas Talk Show.

Filmography

Film

Television

References

External links
 
 Nathan Corddry at Colby-Sawyer College
 The Daily Show Correspondents: Nate Corddry

1977 births
21st-century American male actors
American male stage actors
American male television actors
American television personalities
Male television personalities
Living people
Male actors from Massachusetts
People from Weymouth, Massachusetts
Colby–Sawyer College alumni
Comedians from Massachusetts